Ernest Leslie Sharp (30 September 1885 – 5 March 1946) was an Australian rules footballer who played with Fitzroy in the Victorian Football League (VFL).

Notes

External links 
		

1885 births
1946 deaths
Australian rules footballers from Victoria (Australia)
Fitzroy Football Club players